The Kattubava Mosque or Kattubava Pallivasal situated in Pudukkottai district is an important Islamic pilgrimage centre. It is located 30 kilometres from Pudukkottai on the Thirumayam-Madurai highway. It is famous for its urs which occurs in the month of Rabiyul Ahir.

References 
 

Mosques in Tamil Nadu
Pudukkottai district